Sidhpura is a town and a nagar panchayat in Kasganj district in the Indian state of Uttar Pradesh. It is situated 23 km from Etah in East North-East direction and 31.7 km away from Kasganj in East.

Geography
It has an average elevation of 238 metres (551 feet).

Demographics
 India census, Sidhpura had a population of 12,996. Males constitute 53% of the population and females 47%. Sidhpura has an average literacy rate of 59%, lower than the national average of 59.5%: male literacy is 60%, and female literacy is 44%. In Sidhpura, 19% of the population is under 6 years of age.

References

Cities and towns in Kasganj district